Proceedings of the American Philosophical Society is a quarterly journal published by the American Philosophical Society since 1838.  The journal contains papers which have been read at meetings of the American Philosophical Society each April and November, independent essays sent to the APS by outside scholars, and biographical memoirs of APS Members.

References

External links

 
 Proceedings of the American Philosophical Society, Biodiversity Heritage Library
 

1838 establishments in the United States
Academic journals published by learned and professional societies
Publications established in 1838
Quarterly journals